Charleroi High School is a public high school located in Charleroi, Pennsylvania, USA.  The High School is operated by the Charleroi School District. It was built in 1965, and at the time was noted for being one of the few high schools in Pennsylvania to have a Planetarium. It was renovated in 1999-2001

References

External links 
 Charleroi High School Website

Schools in Washington County, Pennsylvania
Public high schools in Pennsylvania
1965 establishments in Pennsylvania